Antiphon of Rhamnus (480–411 BC) was the earliest of the ten Attic orators, and an important figure in fifth-century Athenian political and intellectual life.  

There is longstanding uncertainty and scholarly controversy over whether the Sophistic works of Antiphon and a treatise on the Interpretation of Dreams were also written by Antiphon the Orator, or whether they were written by a separate man known as Antiphon the Sophist. This article only discusses Antiphon the Orator's biography and oratorical works.

Life
Antiphon  was a statesman who took up rhetoric as a profession. He was active in political affairs in Athens, and, as a zealous supporter of the oligarchical party, was largely responsible for the establishment of the Four Hundred in 411 (see Theramenes); upon restoration of the democracy shortly afterwards, he was accused of treason and condemned to death. Thucydides famously characterized Antiphon's skills, influence, and reputation:

Antiphon may be regarded as the founder of political oratory, but he never addressed the people himself except on the occasion of his trial. Fragments of his speech then, delivered in defense of his policy (called ) have been edited by J. Nicole (1907) from an Egyptian papyrus.

His chief business was that of a logographer, that is a professional speech-writer. He wrote for those who felt incompetent to conduct their own cases—all disputants were obliged to do so—without expert assistance. Fifteen of Antiphon's speeches are extant: twelve are mere school exercises on fictitious cases, divided into tetralogies, each comprising two speeches for prosecution and defence—accusation, defence, reply, counter-reply; three refer to actual legal processes. All deal with cases of homicide.

List of extant speeches
This is a list of extant speeches by Antiphon:
Against the Stepmother for Poisoning
The First Tetralogy: Anonymous Prosecution For Murder
The Second Tetralogy: Prosecution for Accidental Homicide
The Third Tetralogy: Prosecution for Murder Of One Who Pleads Self-Defense
On the Murder of Herodes
On the Choreutes 

Notes

References 
 Edition, with commentary, by Eduard Maetzner (1838)
 Text by Friedrich Blass (1881)
 R. C. Jebb, Attic Orators
 Ps.-Plutarch, Vitae X. Oratorum or Lives of the Ten Orators
 Philostratus, Vit. Sophistarum, i. 15
 Frank Louis Van Cleef, Index Antiphonteus, Ithaca, N.Y. (1895)
 "Antiphon" at Swansea University's website.
 Michael Gagarin, Antiphon the Athenian, 2002, U. of Texas Press.  Argues for the identification of Antiphon the Sophist and Antiphon of Rhamnus.
 Gerard Pendrick, Antiphon the Sophist: The Fragments, 2002, Cambridge U. Press.  Argues that Antiphon the Sophist and Antiphon of Rhamnus are two, and provides a new edition of and commentary on the fragments attributed to the Sophist.
 David Hoffman, "Antiphon the Athenian: Oratory, Law and Justice in the Age of the Sophists/Antiphon the Sophist: The Fragments", Rhetoric Society Quarterly, summer 2006.  A review of Gagarin 2002 and Pendrick 2002.
 Jordi Redondo, 'Antifont. Discursos I-II', Barcelona, Fundació Bernat Metge, 2003-2004 ( et 84-7225-840-8). Argues for the identification of both authors.

Further reading

External links
 Antiphon's Apology, the Papyrus Fragments, French 1907 edition from the Internet Archive
 Xenophon's  Memorabilia  1.6.1-.15 presents a dialogue between Antiphon the Sophist and Socrates.
 Speeches by Antiphon of Rhamnus on Perseus
 A biography on Antiphon of Rhamnus by Richard C. Jebb, The Attic Orators from Antiphon to Isaeos, 1876 on Perseus
 
 The Stanford Encyclopedia of Philosophy article "Callicles and Thrasymachus" discusses the views of Antiphon the Sophist.

Ancient Greek rhetoricians
Ancient Greek mathematicians
5th-century BC Athenians
5th-century BC writers
411 BC deaths
Sophists
Attic orators
480 BC births
5th-century BC mathematicians